Acantholippia is a monotypic genus in the family Verbenaceae that contains only the species Acantholippia seriphioides. It is found in Argentina.

References

Verbenaceae
Verbenaceae genera
Monotypic Lamiales genera